Nambya, or Nanzwa/Nanzva, is a Bantu language spoken by the Nambya people. It is spoken in northwestern Zimbabwe, particularly in the town of Hwange, with a few speakers in northeastern Botswana. It is either classified as a dialect of Kalanga or as a closely related language. The Zimbabwean constitution, in particular the Education Act, as amended in 1990, recognises Nambya and Kalanga as separate indigenous languages.

Phonology 
Nambya is a tonal language. It has a simple 5 vowel system and a typical Bantu consonant-vowel (CV) syllable structure. The language has onsetless syllables, but these are restricted to the word-initial position, making Nambya typical of the Southern Bantu languages.

Vowels

Morphology 
Like many Bantu languages, Nambya has a highly agglutinative morphology.

References 

Languages of Zimbabwe
Languages of Botswana
Shona languages